Supriyo Sen is an independent filmmaker from India. 
He produced and directed the film Tangra Blues (2021).

He directed the documentary Wagah which won the Berlin Today award at the Berlin Film Festival, The Nest which won the Best Environment / Conservation / Preservation  in 48th National Film awards, Way Back Home which won the Best Film on Social Issues in 51st National Film Award, Hope Dies Last in War which won the National Film Award for Best Non-Feature Film in 55th National Film Awards and Swimming Through The Darkness which won the Best Exploration / Adventure Film (including sports) in 66th National Film awards.

Works 
His short documentary Wagah was shown at more than 200 film festivals and was regarded as the third most popular short film in the world in 2009 by German Short Film Magazine. It also won the Berlin Today Award at the Berlin Film Festival. After watching the movie eminent German filmmaker Wim Wenders commented that "Wagah is a manifesto against walls that divides people."

His two hour long feature documentary on the Partition of India, Way Back Home is the first Indian documentary that was commercially released.

Sen is a Berlinale Talent (international young filmmakers program by Berlin Film Festival). He has served as juror at various film festivals, including the Busan International Film Festival, Taiwan International Documentary Festival, DMZ Documentary Festival (Korea), Eagle Award (Indonesia), Kolkata International Film Festival, Dhaka International Short and Documentary Festival, SiGNS (Kerala) and Indian National Award selection.

He has received grants from Sundance Documentary Fund, Jan Vrijman Fund (IDFA) and Asian Cinema Fund (Busan International Film Festival), DMZ Docs Fund several times and worked with NHK, DW TV, Planet, Goethe Institute, Films Division, PSBT and German, French American and Japanese producers.

Filmography

Awards 

Sen has won more than 40 international awards for his films which include Berlin Today Award at Berlin Film Festival, Crystal Globe at Karlovy Vary Film Festival, Grand Prix at Bilbao International Film Festival, BBC Award at Commonwealth Film Festival, Golden Lola (German short film award), Black Pearl Award at Abu Dhabi Film Festival, National Geographic Award at Flickerfest, Golden Conch at Mumbai International Film Festival, as well as Jury and Audience Awards at various festivals including Krakow, Tampere, Hamburg, Uppsala, Munster, Huesca, Winterthur, Damascus, Zagreb, IFFI (Goa), Rio-de-Janeiro, Parnu, Faito, Saguenay.

Retrospective 
A retrospective of his films was organized by IDSFFK and SiGNS (Kerala), Persistence and Resistance (New Delhi), International Documentary Festival (Chennai).

References 

Bengali film directors
Indian documentary film directors
Living people
Date of birth missing (living people)
Place of birth missing (living people)
Year of birth missing (living people)
Film directors from Kolkata
Indian film directors
21st-century Indian film directors